The Scottish Professional Football League (SPFL) is an association football league in Scotland. It comprises the top four divisions of the Scottish football league system. The league was established in 2013, following a merger of the Scottish Premier League (SPL; tier one) and the Scottish Football League (SFL; tiers two to four).  The Scottish Premier League itself had been formed in 1998 as a breakaway from the Scottish Football League, which had been established in 1890.

Clubs

Current members of the Scottish Professional Football League

Former member clubs

See also

List of Scottish Football League clubs
List of Scottish Premier League clubs
Timeline of Scottish football

Notes

References

 
Scottish Professional
 
Scottish Professional
Clubs